Puclaro is an artificial lake created by a dam on the Elqui River, 40 km east of the city of La Serena, Coquimbo Region and 500 km north of Santiago. Regular strong winds make the lake a popular place for kitesurfing.

Its purpose is to improve the irrigation of 21,000 ha of farmland in the Elqui valley.

Dam
Puclaro Dam is an 83 m tall and 640 m long concrete face gravel fill dam with a crest altitude of 435 m. The volume of the dam is 4,630,000 m³. The dam features a spillway over the dam (maximum discharge 3,800 m³/s). The upstream concrete face varies in thickness from 0.45 m to 0.30 m.

Puclaro dam is founded on very pervious alluvial foundations more than 100 m deep.

External links

Gualliguaica - The Drowning Town

References

Dams in Chile
Irrigation in Chile
Reservoirs in Chile
Lakes of Coquimbo Region